Berwick, Maine (disambiguation) may refer to:

Berwick, Maine
North Berwick, Maine
South Berwick, Maine